Ikast is a Danish town in the Mid Jutland Region (Midtjylland). It is the seat of Ikast-Brande Municipality since 2007. It was the seat of the former Ikast Municipality.

Geography
The town is situated in the middle of Jutland. The town is situated 5 km from Hammerum, which is the Eastern outskirts of Herning Municipality. Ikast is situated 28 km from Silkeborg, and 69 km away from Aarhus.

Demography
As of 1 January 2022, the population of the town is 15,979.

History 
Up until late in the nineteenth century, Ikast was nothing more than a few buildings surrounding the church. During industrialization, Ikast established a strong presence in Denmark as one of the main towns for the textile industry, which was the main industry in the area until the start of globalization, where production jobs were outsourced.

The opening of the railway line in the 1850s led to an increase in population, as the existing part of town surrounding the church, and the new part of town, built around the railway station, grew into each other.

The church was originally a Romanesque church, built in the 13th century. The old church burned down in 1904, and was rebuilt into the new church, which was finished in 1907. The church was expanded several times, with the latest expansion happening in 2005.

Notable people 

 Emilie Andersen (1895 in Grødde, Ikast – 1970) a Danish historian and archivist.
 Bo Skovhus (born 1962 in Ikast) a Danish baritone opera singer
 Kurt Aust (born 1955 in Ikast) pen name of Kurt Østergaard, an author and freelance writer

Sport 
 Jens Reno Møller (born 1971 in Ikast) is a Danish racing driver
 Peder Nissen (born 1976 in Ikast) a former badminton player, twice Danish National champion
 Pernille Harder (born 1992 in Ikast) a Danish professional footballer, named in 2018 as Europe's best female footballer
 Jens Martin Gammelby (born 1995 in Ikast) a Danish footballer, who plays for Silkeborg IF
 Lasse Mølhede (born 1995 in Ikast) a Danish badminton player
 Line Skak (born 1997 in Ikast) a Danish handball player who currently plays for TTH Holstebro

References

External links

Website of Ikast

Municipal seats of the Central Denmark Region
Municipal seats of Denmark
Cities and towns in the Central Denmark Region
Ikast-Brande Municipality